Nikoletta Szőke is a Hungarian jazz vocalist who has won international acclaim as winner of the 2005 Shure Montreux Jazz Voice Competition. Since then, she has been pursuing an increasingly successful performing career.

Biography
Nikoletta Szőke is a Hungarian jazz singer, born 8 May 1983 in Zalaegerszeg, Hungary. She moved to the capital of Budapest at age four and began her studies there. Nikoletta, whose father is a professional dulcimer player, showed musical talent at early age, attending musical kindergarten, but then broke off her music career for fourteen years.

After graduating from high school, she decided to study singing. She met her future husband on her first significant performance, József Barcza Horváth bass player, who introduces her to the jazz genre and celebrated jazz musician and teacher Gábor Winand .

After gaining a degree at Technical College of Economy and External Trade Administration Department, she devotes herself solely to singing, rather than to pursue her further studies at the School of Music and ELTE University's English and Russian department.

While learning to sing she also starts her performing career, beginning with the Robert Szakcsi Lakatos Trio, and moving on to other combos. In 2005, after three and a half years of jazz studies and performances, she applies to the prestigious international Shure Montreux Jazz Voice Competition for singers under 30. She is awarded first prize as well as the audience award. Judges included Barbara Hendricks, Randy Crawford, and others.

In January 2006, she participates in the Conference of International Association for Jazz Education (IAJE Conference) in New York. She had held performances at the New York Hilton and the Lincoln Center's Dizzy's Club. Her partners included Gilad Hekselman, Israel (2005 Montreux Guitar Competition Winner), Harold Lopez Nussa-Torres, Cuba (2005 Montreux Piano Competition Winner) and Geoff Newman and Anthony Pinciotti from the USA.
In 2008 she made the album A Song For You for the Atelier Sawano label. Musicians: Robert Lakatos on piano, Thomas Stabenow on bass, and Kalus Weiss on drums.

In 2018, she will attempt to win A Dal 2018 to represent Hungary in the Eurovision Song Contest 2018 with Attila Kökény and Róbert Szakcsi Lakatos with the song Életre kel. They were eliminated in the semi-finals.

References

External links
Nikoletta Szőke's homepage
Nikoletta Szőke on motreuxjazz.com

1983 births
Living people
21st-century Hungarian women singers
Hungarian jazz singers